Emblemaria biocellata, the Twospot blenny, is a species of chaenopsid blenny found in coral reefs around Venezuela, French Guiana, and Colombia, in the western Atlantic Ocean. Males of this species can reach a maximum length of  TL, while females can reach a maximum length of  SL.

References
 Stephens, J.S., Jr., 1970 (1 June) Seven new chaenopsid blennies from the western Atlantic. Copeia 1970 (no. 2): 280–309.

biocellata
Fish described in 1970